The Way I Am is the fourteenth studio album by Billy Preston, released in 1981. The album was arranged by Bob Esty, David Blumberg, Arthur G. Wright, Marty Paich, Gene Page and Billy Preston.

Track listing
"Hope" (Bob Esty, Paul Jabara)  – 3:19
"Good Life Boogie" (Billy Preston)  – 4:17
"Keep on Truckin'" (Frank Wilson, Leonard Caston, Jr., Anita Poree)  – 4:25
"A Change Is Gonna Come" (Sam Cooke)  – 3:57
"Lay Your Feelings on Me" (Kay Lewis, Helen Lewis)  – 4:20
"I Won't Mistreat Your Love" (Preston, Bruce Fisher)  – 3:57
"Baby I'm Yours" (Van McCoy)  – 3:18
"Until Then" (Preston, Jesse Kirkland, Joe Greene)  – 3:34
"The Way I Am" (David Paich)  – 4:55

Personnel 

Billy Preston - piano, keyboards, Hammond organ, vocals
Bobby Kimball - backing vocals
Steve Lukather - guitar
David Paich - keyboards, piano
David Hungate - bass 
Steve Porcaro - keyboards
Jeff Porcaro - drums
Ollie E. Brown - drums 
William Bryant - keyboards 
Dave Budimir - synthesizer 
Sonny Burke - keyboards  
Nathan East - bass   
Charles Fearing - guitar 
James Gadson - drums  
Marlo Henderson - guitar     
Paul Jackson Jr. - guitar 
Abraham Laboriel - bass 
Michael Lang - keyboards 
Reggie McBride - bass      
Greg Poree - guitar 
Melvin "Wah Wah Watson" Ragin - guitar 
Red Rhodes - guitar 
Herman Riley - saxophone 
David Shire - keyboards
Rick Shlosser - drums 
Syreeta Wright - backing Vocals 
Trevor Veitch - guitar 
David T. Walker - guitar 
Freddie "Ready Freddie" Washington - bass
Eddie N. Watkins Jr. - bass 
Nathan Watts - bass 
Les Hurdle - bass
Marvin Charlot - bass
Arthur G. Wright - guitar
Oma Drake, Mona Lisa Young, Terry Young, Mike Reed, Joe Greene, Jesse Kirkland, Stephanie Spruill, Julia Tillman Waters, Maxine Willard Waters, Oren Waters - backing vocals

References

Billy Preston albums
1981 albums
Motown albums
Albums arranged by Marty Paich
Albums arranged by Gene Page
Albums produced by Hal Davis
Albums produced by Berry Gordy
Albums produced by Billy Preston